Dunfermline East was a burgh constituency represented in the House of Commons of the Parliament of the United Kingdom. It elected one Member of Parliament (MP) by the first-past-the-post voting system.

The constituency was created for the 1983 general election from parts of the seats of Central Fife and Dunfermline. It was abolished for the 2005 general election as part of a major revision in the composition of parliamentary constituencies in Scotland.

Most of Dunfermline East and its neighbouring constituency Kirkcaldy now make up the new seat of Kirkcaldy and Cowdenbeath. The remaining parts of the seat were moved to the new Dunfermline and West Fife and Glenrothes constituencies.

The constituency's name was something of a misnomer as it never actually included any part of the town of Dunfermline, all of which was located in the Dunfermline West seat. Cowdenbeath was the largest town in the constituency.

Boundaries
1983–1997: The Dunfermline District electoral divisions of Aberdour/Dalgety Bay/North Queensferry, Ballingry/Lochore, Cowdenbeath/Gray Park, Dunfermline/Rosyth, Hill of Beath/Crossgates/Cowdenbeath, Inverkeithing/Rosyth, Kelty/Lumphinnans, and Lochgelly, and the Kirkcaldy District electoral division of Auchterderran.

1997–2005: The Dunfermline District electoral divisions of Aberdour and Mossside, Benarty and Lumphinans, Cowdenbeath, Dalgety Bay, Inverkeithing and North Queensferry, Kelty, Lochgelly, and Rosyth East and South, and the Kirkcaldy District electoral division of Cardenden and Kinglassie.

Members of Parliament
The constituency's only MP was Gordon Brown of the Labour Party, who was Shadow Chancellor of the Exchequer from 1992 to 1997 and Chancellor of the Exchequer from 1997 to 2007, when he became Prime Minister.

Election results

Elections in the 1980s
:

:

Elections in the 1990s
:

:

Elections in the 2000s
:

References 

Historic parliamentary constituencies in Scotland (Westminster)
Politics of Fife
Constituencies of the Parliament of the United Kingdom established in 1983
Constituencies of the Parliament of the United Kingdom disestablished in 2005
Politics of Dunfermline
Inverkeithing
Lochgelly
Rosyth
Dalgety Bay